Thallus of Miletus, was an epigrammatic poet, five of whose epigrams are preserved in the Greek Anthology. Of these the first is in honour of the birthday of a Roman emperor, or one of the imperial family, on which account Bovinus supposes the poet to be the same person who is mentioned in an extant inscription  as a freedman of Germanicus. The name is given in various forms: Thalos, Thyelaus, Thyillus ; it may have arisen from a confusion between the poet and the celebrated philosopher, Thales of Miletus. The name Thallos occurs frequently in inscriptions from Attica and Ionia.

References

Sources
Pape, Worterbuch d. Griecli. Eigennamen; Brunck, Anal. vol. ii. p. 164 ; Jacobs, Anth. Graec. vol. ii. p. 150, vol. xiii. p. 956 ; Fabric. Bibl. Graec. vol. iv. p. 496.) 

Epigrammatists of the Greek Anthology
Roman-era Milesians
1st-century Greek people
1st-century Greek poets
Poets of ancient Ionia
Ancient Greek slaves and freedmen